Ataşehir is a district of Istanbul, Turkey. It is located at the junction of the O-2 and O-4 motorways on the Anatolian (Asian) side of Istanbul. Its neighbours are the districts of Ümraniye to the north, Sancaktepe to the northeast, Maltepe to the east, Kadıköy to the south and Üsküdar to the west.

As of 2021, the tallest skyscraper in Ataşehir, Istanbul and Turkey is Metropol Istanbul Tower 1 (70 floors, 301 metres tall including its twin spires), which is a mixed-use complex with three towers and a shopping mall.

It's home to the soon-opening Istanbul Finance Centre.

Unlike in Başakşehir, another satellite city (on the western part of the European side of Istanbul), no single-family house types were designed for Ataşehir's residential projects. Most buildings in Ataşehir are high-rise towers, while some of them (especially around the main public squares in the district) are among Istanbul's and Turkey's tallest skyscrapers.

The M4 line (Kozyatağı and Yenisahra stations) of the Istanbul Metro serves the district.

History 
Before 2009, the area of present-day Ataşehir was divided between the districts of Kadıköy, Üsküdar, Ümraniye and Kartal.

The original housing development of Ataşehir was designed to include 18,000 high-rise condominiums offering luxury residences for 80,000 people with higher incomes. Ataşehir was awarded the Habitat prize in 2005.

As of 2006, 8596 housing units were present within the site, housing approximately 35,000 people. New investments still continue on the last empty sites of the district.

Politics and administration 
Ataşehir Municipality has been founded in 2009. The municipal building and the district's security directorate are located in the neighborhood of Barbaros. Ataşehir Municipality has 24 subordinate directorates.

Neighborhoods 
Ataşehir is composed of 17 neighborhoods:

 Aşık Veysel
 Atatürk
 Barbaros
 Esatpaşa
 Ferhatpaşa
 Fetih
 İçerenköy
 İnönü
 Kayışdağı
 Küçükbakkalköy
 Mevlana
 Mimar Sinan
 Mustafa Kemal
 Örnek
 Yeni Çamlıca
 Yenisahra
 Yenişehir

Economy 
Ataşehir is a business and trading centre and hosts the headquarters and offices of numerous companies.

Istanbul International Finance Center (IIFC) is currently being built in Ataşehir.

Transportation 
Ataşehir can be reached with the M4 line (Kozyatağı and Yenisahra stations) of the Istanbul Metro.

For private car owners the subdivision is: 20-30 minutes from the Fatih Sultan Mehmet Bridge; 3 minutes from Highway D-100 and the İzmit-Ankara Trans-European Motorway (TEM); 20 minutes from Bağdat Avenue, the upper-class high street of Kadıköy district; and 30-40 minutes from Sabiha Gökçen Airport, the second international airport of Istanbul.

Sports
Ülker Sports and Event Hall, home of Fenerbahçe's basketball team, is in Ataşehir.

The women's football club Ataşehir Belediyespor plays in the Turkish Women's First Football League. The team was the champion in the 2010–11 and 2011–12 seasons.

Ataşehir Golf Club [tr] has a 6-hole course that was opened in 2017. The club also regularly hosts footgolf events.

Education 
Yeditepe University, one of the largest private universities in Turkey, is located in Ataşehir.

Libraries 
Ahmet Telli Çocuk ve Halk Kütüphanesi is a public library in the district.

Climate 
The district of Ataşehir has a Mediterranean climate (Csa/Cs) according to both Köppen and Trewartha climate classifications, with cool winters and warm to hot summers. It is in USDA hardiness zone 9a and AHS heat zone 3.

Notes

References

External links

District municipality's official website 
Library website

 
Populated places in Istanbul Province
Districts of Istanbul Province